Mary Domitilla Thuener  (Eleanor Margaret Thuener, 1880–1977) was a nun and mathematician who served as the first head of Villa Madonna College.

Early life and education
Thuener was born on October 25, 1880. Her father was an immigrant from Germany who married an American; they had seven children but only three survived. Eleanor, the oldest, was born in Allegheny, Pennsylvania. She completed her studies at St. Mary’s Academy in Monroe, Michigan in 1905, took orders as a Benedictine nun, and entered the St. Waldburg convent in Covington, Kentucky, taking the name Mary Domitilla. There she came to work as a teacher in two local Catholic schools.

By taking evening classes at St. Xavier College, Thuener completed a bachelor's degree in 1920. She completed a master's degree in 1923, in the women's college associated with the Catholic University of America.

Leadership
In 1921, the Benedictines of Covington founded Villa Madonna College, later to become Thomas More College. Thuener became its first dean, and also taught mathematics there. In 1929, she left for additional study at the Catholic University of America, completing a PhD in 1932. Her dissertation, supervised by Aubrey Edward Landry, was On the Number and Reality of the Self-Symmetric Quadrilaterals In-and-Circumscribed to the Triangular-Symmetric Rational Quartic. She then returned to Villa Madonna as a mathematics and physics instructor.

She served as prioress of St. Waldburg's beginning in 1943.

Thuener died on September 29, 1977.

References

1880 births
1977 deaths
20th-century American mathematicians
Women mathematicians
Xavier University alumni
Catholic University of America alumni
Thomas More University people
Benedictine prioresses
20th-century American Roman Catholic nuns